In algebra, the kernel of a homomorphism (function that preserves the structure) is generally the inverse image of 0 (except for groups whose operation is denoted multiplicatively, where the kernel is the inverse image of 1). An important special case is the kernel of a linear map. The kernel of a matrix, also called the null space, is the kernel of the linear map defined by the matrix. 

The kernel of a homomorphism is reduced to 0 (or 1) if and only if the homomorphism is injective, that is if the inverse image of every element consists of a single element. This means that the kernel can be viewed as a measure of the degree to which the homomorphism fails to be injective.  

For some types of structure, such as abelian groups and vector spaces, the possible kernels are exactly the substructures of the same type. This is not always the case, and, sometimes, the possible kernels have received a special name, such as normal subgroup for groups and two-sided ideals for rings.

Kernels allow defining quotient objects (also called quotient algebras in universal algebra, and cokernels in category theory). For many types of algebraic structure, the fundamental theorem on homomorphisms (or first isomorphism theorem) states that image of a homomorphism is isomorphic to the quotient by the kernel.

The concept of a kernel has been extended to structures such that the inverse image of a single element is not sufficient for deciding whether a homomorphism is injective. In these cases, the kernel is a congruence relation.

This article is a survey for some important types of kernels in algebraic structures.

Survey of examples

Linear maps 

Let V and W be vector spaces over a field (or more generally, modules over a ring) and let T be a linear map from V to W. If 0W is the zero vector of W, then the kernel of T is the preimage of the zero subspace {0W}; that is, the subset of V consisting of all those elements of V that are mapped by T to the element 0W.

Since a linear map preserves zero vectors, the zero vector 0V of V must belong to the kernel. The transformation T is injective if and only if its kernel is reduced to the zero subspace.

The kernel ker T is always a linear subspace of V. Thus, it makes sense to speak of the quotient space V/(ker T). The first isomorphism theorem for vector spaces states that this quotient space is naturally isomorphic to the image of T (which is a subspace of W). As a consequence, the dimension of V equals the dimension of the kernel plus the dimension of the image.

If V and W are finite-dimensional and bases have been chosen, then T can be described by a matrix M, and the kernel can be computed by solving the homogeneous system of linear equations . In this case, the kernel of T may be identified to the kernel of the matrix M, also called "null space" of M. The dimension of the null space, called the nullity of M, is given by the number of columns of M minus the rank of M, as a consequence of the rank–nullity theorem.

Solving homogeneous differential equations often amounts to computing the kernel of certain differential operators.
For instance, in order to find all twice-differentiable functions f from the real line to itself such that

let V be the space of all twice differentiable functions, let W be the space of all functions, and define a linear operator T from V to W by

for f in V and x an arbitrary real number.
Then all solutions to the differential equation are in ker T.

One can define kernels for homomorphisms between modules over a ring in an analogous manner. This includes kernels for homomorphisms between abelian groups as a special case. This example captures the essence of kernels in general abelian categories; see Kernel (category theory).

Group homomorphisms
Let G and H be groups and let f be a group homomorphism from G to H. If eH is the identity element of H, then the kernel of f is the preimage of the singleton set {eH}; that is, the subset of G consisting of all those elements of G that are mapped by f to the element eH.

The kernel is usually denoted  (or a variation). In symbols:
 

Since a group homomorphism preserves identity elements, the identity element eG of G must belong to the kernel.

The homomorphism f is injective if and only if its kernel is only the singleton set {eG}. Thus . f is a group homomorphism, so inverses and group operations are preserved, giving ; in other words, and ker f would not be the singleton. Conversely, distinct elements of the kernel violate injectivity directly: if there would exist an element , then , thus f would not be injective.

 is a subgroup of G and further it is a normal subgroup. Thus, there is a corresponding quotient group . This is isomorphic to f(G), the image of G under f (which is a subgroup of H also), by the first isomorphism theorem for groups.

In the special case of abelian groups, there is no deviation from the previous section.

Example 
Let G be the cyclic group on 6 elements  with modular addition, H be the cyclic on 2 elements  with modular addition, and f the homomorphism that maps each element g in G to the element g modulo 2 in H. Then , since all these elements are mapped to 0H. It is indeed isomorphic to H.

Ring homomorphisms

Let R and S be rings (assumed unital) and let f be a ring homomorphism from R to S.
If 0S is the zero element of S, then the kernel of f is its kernel as linear map over the integers, or, equivalently, as additive groups. It is the preimage of the zero ideal {0S}, which is, the subset of R consisting of all those elements of R that are mapped by f to the element 0S.
The kernel is usually denoted  (or a variation).
In symbols:
 

Since a ring homomorphism preserves zero elements, the zero element 0R of R must belong to the kernel.
The homomorphism f is injective if and only if its kernel is only the singleton set {0R}.
This is always the case if R is a field, and S is not the zero ring.

Since ker f contains the multiplicative identity only when S is the zero ring, it turns out that the kernel is generally not a subring of R. The kernel is a subrng, and, more precisely, a two-sided ideal of R.
Thus, it makes sense to speak of the quotient ring R/(ker f).
The first isomorphism theorem for rings states that this quotient ring is naturally isomorphic to the image of f (which is a subring of S). (Note that rings need not be unital for the kernel definition).

To some extent, this can be thought of as a special case of the situation for modules, since these are all bimodules over a ring R:
 R itself;
 any two-sided ideal of R (such as ker f);
 any quotient ring of R (such as R/(ker f)); and
 the codomain of any ring homomorphism whose domain is R (such as S, the codomain of f).
However, the isomorphism theorem gives a stronger result, because ring isomorphisms preserve multiplication while module isomorphisms (even between rings) in general do not.

This example captures the essence of kernels in general Mal'cev algebras.

Monoid homomorphisms
Let M and N be monoids and let f be a monoid homomorphism from M to N. Then the kernel of f is the subset of the direct product  consisting of all those ordered pairs of elements of M whose components are both mapped by f to the same element in N. The kernel is usually denoted  (or a variation thereof). In symbols:
 

Since f is a function, the elements of the form  must belong to the kernel. The homomorphism f is injective if and only if its kernel is only the diagonal set .

It turns out that  is an equivalence relation on M, and in fact a congruence relation. Thus, it makes sense to speak of the quotient monoid . The first isomorphism theorem for monoids states that this quotient monoid is naturally isomorphic to the image of f (which is a submonoid of N; for the congruence relation).

This is very different in flavour from the above examples. In particular, the preimage of the identity element of N is not enough to determine the kernel of f.

Universal algebra
All the above cases may be unified and generalized in universal algebra.

General case
Let A and B be algebraic structures of a given type and let f be a homomorphism of that type from A to B.
Then the kernel of f is the subset of the direct product A × A consisting of all those ordered pairs of elements of A whose components are both mapped by f to the same element in B.
The kernel is usually denoted  (or a variation).
In symbols:
 

Since f is a function, the elements of the form (a, a) must belong to the kernel.

The homomorphism f is injective if and only if its kernel is exactly the diagonal set {(a, a) : a ∈ A}.

It is easy to see that ker f is an equivalence relation on A, and in fact a congruence relation.
Thus, it makes sense to speak of the quotient algebra A/(ker f).
The first isomorphism theorem in general universal algebra states that this quotient algebra is naturally isomorphic to the image of f (which is a subalgebra of B).

Note that the definition of kernel here (as in the monoid example) doesn't depend on the algebraic structure; it is a purely set-theoretic concept.
For more on this general concept, outside of abstract algebra, see kernel of a function.

Malcev algebras

In the case of Malcev algebras, this construction can be simplified. Every Malcev algebra has a special neutral element (the zero vector in the case of vector spaces, the identity element in the case of commutative groups, and the zero element in the case of rings or modules). The characteristic feature of a Malcev algebra is that we can recover the entire equivalence relation ker f from the equivalence class of the neutral element.

To be specific, let A and B be Malcev algebraic structures of a given type and let f be a homomorphism of that type from A to B. If eB is the neutral element of B, then the kernel of f is the preimage of the singleton set {eB}; that is, the subset of A consisting of all those elements of A that are mapped by f to the element eB.
The kernel is usually denoted  (or a variation). In symbols:
 

Since a Malcev algebra homomorphism preserves neutral elements, the identity element eA of A must belong to the kernel. The homomorphism f is injective if and only if its kernel is only the singleton set {eA}.

The notion of ideal generalises to any Malcev algebra (as linear subspace in the case of vector spaces, normal subgroup in the case of groups, two-sided ideals in the case of rings, and submodule in the case of modules). 
It turns out that ker f is not a subalgebra of A, but it is an ideal.
Then it makes sense to speak of the quotient algebra G/(ker f).
The first isomorphism theorem for Malcev algebras states that this quotient algebra is naturally isomorphic to the image of f (which is a subalgebra of B).

The connection between this and the congruence relation for more general types of algebras is as follows.
First, the kernel-as-an-ideal is the equivalence class of the neutral element eA under the kernel-as-a-congruence. For the converse direction, we need the notion of quotient in the Mal'cev algebra (which is division on either side for groups and subtraction for vector spaces, modules, and rings).
Using this, elements a and b of A are equivalent under the kernel-as-a-congruence if and only if their quotient a/b is an element of the kernel-as-an-ideal.

Algebras with nonalgebraic structure
Sometimes algebras are equipped with a nonalgebraic structure in addition to their algebraic operations.
For example, one may consider topological groups or topological vector spaces, which are equipped with a topology.
In this case, we would expect the homomorphism f to preserve this additional structure; in the topological examples, we would want f to be a continuous map.
The process may run into a snag with the quotient algebras, which may not be well-behaved.
In the topological examples, we can avoid problems by requiring that topological algebraic structures be Hausdorff (as is usually done); then the kernel (however it is constructed) will be a closed set and the quotient space will work fine (and also be Hausdorff).

Kernels in category theory
The notion of kernel in category theory is a generalisation of the kernels of abelian algebras; see Kernel (category theory).
The categorical generalisation of the kernel as a congruence relation is the kernel pair.
(There is also the notion of difference kernel, or binary equaliser.)

See also

 Kernel (linear algebra)
 Zero set

Notes

References

Algebra
Isomorphism theorems
Linear algebra